Rheinfelden railway station is a railway station in the municipality of Rheinfelden, in the Swiss canton of Aargau. It is an intermediate stop on the Bözberg line and is served by local and regional trains.

Services

Regional 
The following regional trains call at Rheinfelden:

 InterRegio: half-hourly service from Basel SBB to Zürich Hauptbahnhof, with every other train continuing to Zürich Airport.

Local 
Rheinfelden is served by the S1 the Basel S-Bahn:

 : half-hourly service from Basel SBB to Frick or Laufenburg.

References

External links 
 
 

Railway stations in the canton of Aargau
Swiss Federal Railways stations
Rheinfelden (Aargau)